In mathematics, polyad is a concept of category theory introduced by Jean Bénabou in generalising monads. A polyad in a bicategory D is a bicategory morphism Φ from a locally punctual bicategory C to D, . (A bicategory C is called locally punctual if all hom-categories C(X,Y) consist of one object and one morphism only.) Monads are polyads  where C has only one object.

Notes

Bibliography
 

Category theory